The Pontifical Ecclesiastical Academy is one of the Roman Colleges of the Catholic Church. The academy is dedicated to training priests to serve in the diplomatic corps and the Secretariat of State of the Holy See.

Despite its name, the Pontifical Ecclesiastical Academy is not one of the ten Pontifical Academies of the Holy See.

The patron of the Pontifical Ecclesiastical Academy is Saint Anthony the Great.

History
The diplomatic service of the Holy See can be traced back to 325 AD when Pope Sylvester I sent legates to represent him at the First Council of Nicaea. The academy was created as the Pontifical Academy of Ecclesiastical Nobles in 1701 by Abbot Pietro Garagni, in close collaboration with Blessed Sebastian Valfrè of the Turin Oratory.

Function
Located inside Palazzo Severoli on the Piazza della Minerva in central Rome, the Pontifical Ecclesiastical Academy trains Catholic priests sent by their bishop from different parts of the world to study ecclesiastical and international diplomacy, particularly in order that the alumni may later be selected to serve in the Diplomatic posts of the Holy See—ultimately as a papal nuncio, or ambassador. Many leaders of the church have been alumni of the academy, including Popes Clement XIII, Leo XII, Leo XIII, Benedict XV, and Paul VI.

Students spend four years at the academy; three years earning a licentiate in canon law (J.C.L.) from a Roman University, then two years earning a doctorate in canon law (J.C.D.), or theology (S.T.D.) (normally at the Pontifical Lateran University). If the students that have been recruited already have a J.C.D. then their time at the PEA is shortened to two years. The courses are usually in diplomatic history, languages and diplomatic writing and are considered not to be academic, but rather focus on the practical skills needed to serve as a diplomat. By the end of his studies, each student has to possess a working knowledge of at least two languages in addition to his mother tongue.

Revised requirements for those who enter the Academy beginning in 2020/2021 include a year of pastoral work in a missionary context.

The President of the academy is Archbishop Joseph Marino, who was previously Apostolic Nuncio to Malaysia, East Timor, as well as Apostolic Delegate To Brunei. He succeeded Archbishop Giampiero Gloder on 21 October 2019 when Archbishop Golder was named by Pope Francis as Apostolic Nuncio to Cuba.

Presidents

See also
 Global organisation of the Catholic Church
 Index of Vatican City-related articles

References

External links
Pontifical Ecclesiastical Academy
Presidents

 

 
Catholic universities and colleges in Italy
Foreign relations of the Holy See
Diplomacy
1701 establishments in the Papal States
1701 establishments in Italy
Rome R. IX Pigna